Lieutenant-Colonel Sir Malcolm Donald Murray  (9 July 1867 – 2 August 1938) was a British Army officer and courtier.

Background
Murray was the younger son of Brigadier-General Alexander Henry Murray (1829-1885) by his wife Martha Frances Vincent Davenport (d. 1911). His father was a patrilineal grandson of the 4th Earl of Dunmore, who was descended from a younger son of the first Marquess of Atholl, of the Clan Murray.

Military career
Murray was commissioned a Second lieutenant in the Seaforth Highlanders on 29 February 1888. He was promoted to Lieutenant on 4 September 1889, and to Captain on 1 February 1895. At the outbreak of the Second Boer War in 1899, Murray was sent with his battalion to South Africa, where he fought in the Transvaal. After his return to the United Kingdom, he was in February 1902 seconded for service on the Staff, and appointed Aide-de-camp to Major-General Ronald Lane, Commanding the Infantry Brigade at Malta. The following year, Murray was appointed Aide-de-camp to Field Marshal the Duke of Connaught, and served as such during his remaining years as Commander-in-Chief Ireland (until 1904), and from 1904-06 when he was Inspector-General to the Forces.

He rejoined his regiment on the outbreak of the First World War, and retired as Lieutenant-Colonel after serving on the Staff.

Courtier

Murray was Extra Equerry to Prince Arthur, Duke of Connaught and Strathearn from 1903 to 1907, when he was appointed Equerry and Comptroller of the Household to His Royal Highness. He served as Deputy Ranger of Windsor Great Park from 1929 to 1937.

Honours
Murray was appointed a Member (4th class) of the Royal Victorian Order (MVO) in 1905, promoted to a Commander (CVO) of the order in the 1909 Birthday Honours list, knighted as a Knight Commander (KCVO) of the order in 1916, and promoted to Knight Grand Cross (GCVO) in the 1936 Birthday Honours list. He was appointed a Companion of the Order of the Bath (CB) in the 1911 Coronation Honours, and later appointed a Companion of the Order of the Indian Empire (CIE).

He also received numerous foreign decorations.

Death
Murray died on 2 August 1938 from drowning after falling off of a capsized boat in Virginia Water Lake in the Windsor Great Park, Borough of Runnymede in the county of Surrey. He hit his neck on the way down, incapacitating him and rendering him unable to swim. One individual, Alexander Ure, tried unsuccessfully to save him.

Family
Murray married, in 1898, Lady Hilda Joanna Gwendolen Finch (1872-1931), daughter of Heneage Finch, 7th Earl of Aylesford. They had one son, Lieutenant-Colonel Iain Arthur Murray (1904-1986).

References

1867 births
1938 deaths
Companions of the Order of the Bath
Knights Grand Cross of the Royal Victorian Order
Companions of the Order of the Indian Empire
Seaforth Highlanders officers
British Army personnel of the Second Boer War
British Army personnel of World War I